The Shenyang BA-5 was a target drone developed in the People's Republic of China, from Mikoyan-Gurevich MiG-15bis fighters withdrawn from manned use at the end of their service life.

Guidance and control equipment was installed in the cockpit in lieu of the ejection seat, with the BA-5 being used for the training of fighter pilots and surface-to-air missile crews.

Operators

People's Liberation Army Air Force

Specifications (MiG-15bis/BA-5)

See also

References

China–Soviet Union relations
1960s Chinese military aircraft
Target drones of China
BA-5
1960s Chinese special-purpose aircraft